Luke Glen Richardson  (born March 26, 1969) is a Canadian professional ice hockey coach who is the head coach of the Chicago Blackhawks of the National Hockey League. Prior to his coaching career, Richardson played as a defenceman in the NHL for 21 seasons.

Playing career
Richardson was selected seventh overall by the Toronto Maple Leafs in the 1987 NHL Entry Draft after two successful seasons with the Peterborough Petes of the Ontario Hockey League (OHL). Midway through his rookie NHL season, on January 6, 1988, Richardson was the victim of an infamous attack from Dino Ciccarelli of the Minnesota North Stars, who clubbed him over the head several times with his stick. Ciccarelli was later convicted of assault, serving one day in jail and paying a fine of C$1,000. However, the assault had no discernible effects on the play of Richardson. He remained a regular on the Toronto blueline until 1991 when he was involved in a blockbuster trade, moving to the Edmonton Oilers (along with Vincent Damphousse, Scott Thornton, Peter Ing, future considerations and cash) in exchange for Grant Fuhr, Glenn Anderson and Craig Berube.

Though not a great point producer, Richardson developed a reputation as an aggressive, stay-at-home blueliner. He would be consistent in that regard during stops with the Oilers, the Philadelphia Flyers and the Columbus Blue Jackets. It was with the Flyers that Richardson came the closest to a Stanley Cup appearance in 2000, when the Flyers lost 4–3 in the Eastern Conference Finals to the New Jersey Devils.

During the 2005–06 season, his last as captain of the Blue Jackets, Richardson was traded back to Toronto on March 8, 2006. Richardson continued playing in the 2006–07 season when he signed a one-year contract with the Tampa Bay Lightning, playing in 27 games and registering 3 assists and 16 penalty minutes. Richardson was a healthy scratch by the end of the 2006–07 season and playoffs, and became an unrestricted free agent that summer.

On August 7, 2007, Richardson signed a one-year, $500,000 two-way contract with his hometown Ottawa Senators, amid the speculation he would soon announce his retirement from the NHL. On February 15, 2008, Richardson was named the Senators' nominee for the Bill Masterton Memorial Trophy, though the award went to Jason Blake of the Toronto Maple Leafs.

On September 27, 2008, Richardson re-signed with Ottawa to a one-year, two-way contract. During the 2008–09 season and, being used primarily as a reserve defenceman, Richardson announced his retirement as a player on November 27, 2008, having played in just two games that season, with the intention of pursuing a coaching career. He was hired as an assistant coach by the Senators later that season.

Coaching career

Ottawa Senators
Richardson began his coaching career during the 2009–10 season behind the bench of the Ottawa Senators, as an assistant coach to head coach Cory Clouston. During the two years under Clouston, the Senators struggled to establish themselves as playoff contenders, enduring setbacks caused by injuries, changes from the Senators' usual defensive strategy to an unsuccessful offensive play style, and communication issues between Clouston and the Senators roster. Clouston was fired by general manager Bryan Murray in Richardson's second year. Richardson then served under new head coach Paul MacLean during the 2011–12 season in his last year as an assistant coach with the team. During his time behind the Senators' bench, the Senators posted a 117–103–26 record over three seasons, making the Stanley Cup playoffs twice but never progressing past the first round, losing to the Pittsburgh Penguins in six games, and falling one game short to the New York Rangers.

Binghamton Senators
After three seasons as an assistant coach in Ottawa, Richardson joined the Binghamton Senators, Ottawa's American Hockey League (AHL) affiliate at the time, as head coach. During his rookie season as head coach, Richardson led an inexperienced Binghamton team to a 44–24–1–7 record, finishing fourth in the AHL's Eastern Conference. He was named coach of the AHL Eastern Conference all-star team in 2012–13 after guiding the Senators to the conference's best record at the all-star break. The Senators' organization subsequently rewarded Richardson with a contract extension through the 2014–15 season.

Richardson signed another one-year contract for 2015–16. In so doing, he turned down an assistant position with Ottawa, seeking to stay as head coach of Binghamton, with an end to pursuing a future NHL head coaching opportunity. At the end of the season, after the Ottawa Senators had fired head coach Dave Cameron, Richardson opted to leave the Senators' organization to pursue other opportunities. Richardson had asked to be considered for the Ottawa head coach position but was turned down by new general manager Pierre Dorion.

New York Islanders
On May 18, 2017, Richardson was hired by the New York Islanders as an assistant coach.

Montreal Canadiens
On July 7, 2018, Richardson joined the Montreal Canadiens as an assistant coach to Claude Julien. On June 19, 2021, he temporarily served as head coach in game 3 of the Stanley Cup Semifinals against the Vegas Golden Knights when interim head coach Dominique Ducharme entered isolation after testing positive for COVID-19.

Chicago Blackhawks
On June 27, 2022, Richardson was named by the Chicago Blackhawks as their 40th head coach in franchise history.

International
On October 7, 2016, Richardson was named assistant coach for Canada at the Deutschland-Cup. In December 2016, he served as head coach of Canada at the Spengler Cup in Switzerland, leading Canada to its 14th title at the event.

International play
Before he started his NHL career, Richardson played for Team Canada in 1987 and was involved in the infamous Punch-up in Piestany brawl.

Personal life
Richardson and his wife Stephanie raised two daughters, Daron and Morgan. On November 13, 2010, Daron died by suicide at the family home in Ottawa. Five days later, 5,600 mourners attended a celebration of life ceremony for her at Scotiabank Place. The Philadelphia Flyers, one of Richardson's former teams, held a moment of silence before their game against the Senators on November 15. On February 2, 2011, the Richardsons, the Royal Ottawa Foundation for Mental Health, the Sens Foundation and the Ottawa Senators announced the creation of a program to inspire conversations about youth mental health. Known as "Do it for Daron", the hope was to honour her memory while raising money to prevent teenage suicide. Luke and Stephanie were decorated with the Meritorious Service Cross for their efforts in 2018.

During the 2011–12 Canada women's national ice hockey team season, Richardson's daughter Morgan was a member of the Canadian National Under-18 team that participated in a three-game series against the United States in August 2011.

Richardson is the uncle of current Ottawa Senators defenceman Jakob Chychrun.

Awards
1999–2000: Pelle Lindbergh Memorial Trophy (Philadelphia Flyers)

Career statistics

Regular season and playoffs

International

See also
Captain (ice hockey)
List of NHL players with 1000 games played
List of NHL players with 2000 career penalty minutes

References

External links
 

1969 births
Living people
Canadian ice hockey defencemen
Columbus Blue Jackets players
Edmonton Oilers players
Ice hockey people from Ottawa
National Hockey League first-round draft picks
Ottawa Senators coaches
Ottawa Senators players
Peterborough Petes (ice hockey) players
Philadelphia Flyers players
Tampa Bay Lightning players
Toronto Maple Leafs draft picks
Toronto Maple Leafs players
New York Islanders coaches
Montreal Canadiens coaches
Canadian ice hockey coaches